The Temple, Congregation B'nai Jehudah is the oldest and largest synagogue in the greater Kansas City metropolitan area. Established in 1870 in Kansas City, Missouri, it was a founding member of the Union for Reform Judaism. Its fourth building, designed by Kivett and Myers architects, was a modernist structure that was "striking for its exterior profile and massing and its combination of natural and industrial forms to create an appearance rooted in both primeval nature and futuristic design." Completed in 1969, it was demolished after the congregation relocated to Overland Park, Kansas in 2000. The senior rabbi is Arthur P. Nemitoff, the rabbi is Sarah Smiley, and the rabbi emeritus is Michael R. Zedek.

References

Reform synagogues in Kansas
1870 establishments in Missouri
Religious organizations established in 1870
Synagogues completed in 1969
Synagogues completed in 2000
Modernist synagogues
Founding members of the Union for Reform Judaism